Nikolay Nikolayevich Inozemtsev (: April 4, 1921 – August 12, 1982) was a Soviet economist, political scientist, historian and journalist. He is best remembered as a former Deputy Editor-in-Chief of the Communist Party daily newspaper Pravda and as Director of the prestigious Institute of World Economy and International Relations.

Biography

Early years

He was born in Moscow.

Career

Inozemtsev joined the All-Union Communist Party in 1943.

He was a participant in the Great Patriotic War, serving from 1941 to 1945 and earning four decorations, twice receiving the Order of the Red Star.

In 1949 Inozemtszev graduated from the Moscow State Institute of International Relations.

He was Deputy Chairman of Gosplan, the Soviet State Planning Commission. From 1959 to 1961 he was Deputy Director of the Institute of World Economy and International Relations.

He was a member of the editorial board of the journal Kommunist and in 1961 he became Deputy Editor in Chief of Pravda, where he remained for five years, departing in May 1966 to return as Director of the Institute of World Economy and International Relations.

Inozemtsev was elected to the Academy of Sciences of the Soviet Union in 1968.

Inozemtsev was a recipient of the Order of Lenin.

The 26th Congress of the CPSU in 1981 elected Inozemtsev to membership on the Central Committee of the Communist Party of the Soviet Union. He remained in that capacity until the time of his death.

Death and legacy

Nikolai Inozemtsev died August 12, 1982 in Moscow, aged 61.

Footnotes

Works

 Amerikanskii imperializm i germanskii vopros (1945–1954 gg.) (American Imperialism and the German Question (1945-1954). Moscow, 1954.
 Vneshniaia politika SShA v epokhu imperializma (Foreign Policy of the USA in the Epoch of Imperialism). Moscow, 1960.
 Sovremennyi kapitalizm: Novye iavleniia i protivorechiia (Contemporary Capitalism: New Developments and Contradictions). New, Moscow, 1972.
 "Kursom ekonimicheskoi integratsii" (The Course of Economic Integration). Planovoe Khozyaistvoe 8
 "Koordinatsiya narodnokhozyaistvennykh planov stranchlenov SEV: Novye problemy y zadachi", Planovoe Khozyaistvoe 10.

External links
 "Nikolai Inozemtsev (1921-1982)," Institute of World Economy and International Relations, www.imemo.ru/ —In Russian, includes photo.

1921 births
1982 deaths
20th-century Russian diarists
20th-century Russian historians
Writers from Moscow
Central Committee of the Communist Party of the Soviet Union members
Communist Party of the Soviet Union members
Full Members of the USSR Academy of Sciences
Members of the German Academy of Sciences at Berlin
Moscow State Institute of International Relations alumni
Ninth convocation members of the Supreme Soviet of the Soviet Union
Tenth convocation members of the Supreme Soviet of the Soviet Union
Recipients of the Order of Lenin
Recipients of the Order of the Red Banner of Labour
Recipients of the Order of the Red Star
Recipients of the USSR State Prize
Marxian economists
Russian diarists
Russian economists
Russian historians
Russian male journalists
Soviet diarists
Soviet economists
Soviet historians
Soviet journalists
World War II spies for the Soviet Union
Burials at Novodevichy Cemetery